The 2010 Chinese labour unrest was a series of labour disputes, strike actions, and protests in the south of the People's Republic of China that saw striking workers successfully receive higher pay packages.

Among the incidents were a string of employee suicides at Taiwan-owned electronics manufacturer Foxconn and strike actions at Honda factories in Guangdong province, both of which resulted in wage increases.

The Economist stated that wages were merely rising to make up for lost ground due to wage freezes, and China's inflationary monetary environment at the time made regular pay rises a necessity for workers concerned with maintaining a high quality of life. Reuters quoted Toyota CEO Akio Toyoda, as saying, "this has both good and bad elements. A wage increase is not necessarily bad if properly managed. The experience of the past 100 years shows that auto workers become auto consumers also."

The events at Honda and Foxconn were followed by a string of labour-related protests and strikes at foreign-owned factories, mostly in the south of the country.

Foreign companies
Although most of the strikes did take place at foreign-owned facilities, a few Chinese companies also experienced labor unrest.

Foxconn

In 2009 Sun Danyong, an employee of electronics manufacturer Foxconn Technology Group, committed suicide. Reports emerged of questionable labour practices at Foxconn factories, and a number of other suicides occurred in 2010. Foxconn announced that workers with a monthly wage of 900 RMB ($131.77 at the time) would immediately receive a 30% increase, to 1200 RMB, with a spokesman stating that "It's been a while since we increased wages, hence the decision."

Honda
Starting 17 May, a prolonged strike at a Honda automobile parts factory resulted in suspension of operations at all four of Honda's Chinese production bases, which are located in Guangdong and Hubei provinces. The high-profile strike was covered in domestic<ref>"Strike in China Highlights Gap in Workers’ Pay" article by Keith Bradsher and David Barboza in The New York Times 28 May 2010</ref> and international media.

Pay raises of 24%Honda Restarts Operations at Chinese Auto-parts Factory Today After Strike bloomberg.com, Makiko Kitamura – 1 June 2010 11:30 pm PT halted the strike action in early June.

Honda is believed to have lost 3 billion yuan in sales as a result.

Other strikes at different Honda parts factories followed."A Labor Movement Stirs in China" article by Keith Bradsher in The New York Times 10 June 2010"With Concessions, Honda Strike Fizzles in China" article by Keith Bradher in The New York Times 13 June 2010

Toyota
In mid-June strikes spread to Toyota plants."With Strike, Toyota Idles Auto Plant in China" article by Hiroko Tabuchi in The New York Times 22 June 2010

Media response

According to The New York Times after initial nationwide coverage of the strikes, domestic media coverage was swiftly curtailed. Restrictions on the local, Chinese press were also reported by The Financial Times.

The same day as The New York Times report, China Daily published seven articles (3 of them rewrites/reposts) dealing with the strikes and worker relations, however.

Technology aids strikersThe New York Times mentioned the use of technology by striking workers in one article. Detailed accounts of strikes were posted online by the strikers hours after they began, and videos were uploaded by the strikers showing confrontations between management and employees. Striking workers avoided using popular online networking tool QQ in favour of text messaging to escape the scrutiny of government internet censors who regularly monitor the site. Online forums were used to share strategies and grievances.

Economic policy implications
Economist Cai Fang remarked in a paper cited by China Daily that the country has hit its Lewisian turning point and mentioned that China must seek "new engines for economic growth".

China is considering taking policy steps to double average wages over the five years from 2011, and several Chinese provinces raised the legal minimum wage. State media also stated that higher wages will help boost domestic consumption and help move China away from a reliance on exports for growth towards an economy more driven by domestic consumption.

Economist Andy Xie said that there is ample scope for increased wages in China due to its superior infrastructure as compared to competing, low-wage alternative nations.

Government response
Strikes are not new in China. Chinese authorities have long tolerated limited, local protests by workers unhappy over wages or other issues. The Pearl River Delta alone has up to 10,000 labor disputes each year. In the spring of 2008, a local union official described strikes as "as natural as arguments between a husband and wife". The Chinese government sought balance on the issue; while it has recently repeated calls for increased domestic consumption through wage increases and regulations, it is also aware that labour unrest could cause political instability.

In response to the string of employee suicides at Foxconn, Guangdong CPC chief Wang Yang called on companies to improve their treatment of workers. Wang said that "economic growth should be people-oriented". As the strikes intensified, Wang went further by calling for more effective negotiations mechanisms, particularly the reform of existing trade unions. At the same time, authorities began shutting down some websites reporting on the labour incidents, and have restricted reporting, particularly on strikes occurring at domestic-owned factories. Guangdong province also announced plans to "professionalize union staff" by taking union representatives off of company payroll to ensure their independence from management influence.

On 14 June, Premier Wen Jiabao visited construction workers on Beijing Subway's Line 6. Wen said to the workers: "Your work is glorious and should be respected by society at large. Migrant workers should be cared for, protected and respected, especially the younger generation of them ... The government and the public should be treating the young migrant workers like their own children." A day later, without mention of strikes, People's Daily'' released an editorial that warned the country's manufacturing model could be at a turning point and urged employers to raise salaries. In addition, the party's official newspaper said that China's development model should look towards creating more service-sector jobs and increasing domestic consumption.

List of labour incidents
The following is a list of cases; the list is not complete.

See also
 2002-2003 Chinese protest movement
 Labor relations in China

References

Chinese Labour Unrest, 2010
Labor disputes in China
Protests in China